Gaspard I de Coligny, Count of Coligny, seigneur de Châtillon (1465/1470–1522), known as the Marshal of Châtillon, was a French soldier.

He was born in Châtillon-Coligny, the second son of Jean III de Coligny and Eleanor de Courcelles. He served in the Italian Wars from 1495 to 1515 and was created Marshal of France in 1516. He died in Dax.

By his wife, Louise de Montmorency, sister of Anne de Montmorency, he had three sons: 
Odet, Cardinal de Châtillon
Gaspard, Admiral of France
François, Seigneur d'Andelot

All three played an important part in the first period of the French Wars of Religion.

Family tree

References

Sources

 Louis de La Roque: Catalogue historique des généraux français, connétables, maréchaux de France, lieutenants généraux, maréchaux de camp. A. Desaide, Paris 1896–1902, p. 46

Counts of France
Marshals of France
People from Loiret
16th-century French people
15th-century births
1522 deaths
Gaspard 1